Brickworks Group Representation Constituency (Traditional Chinese: 磚廠集選區; Simplified Chinese: 砖厂集选区) is a defunct Group Representation Constituency in Bukit Merah, Queenstown and Clementi, Singapore from 1988 to 1997.

Etymology
In the early days of Singapore, there was a brick factory in the Bukit Merah (Alexandra) areas and hence the name. One of the notable place in that area includes the ABC Brickworks Hawker Centre where it has different delicacies to offer, located in Jalan Bukit Merah.

Members of Parliament

Candidates and results

Elections in 1990s

Elections in 1980s

References

1991 General Election's result
1988 General Election's result
Singapore's Electoral division map in 1997 GE
Singapore's Electoral division map in 1991 GE
Singapore's Electoral division map in 1988 GE
Singapore's Electoral division map in 1984 GE

Singaporean electoral divisions
Clementi
Queenstown, Singapore